Solomon Wayne Moore (August 17, 1945 – August 19, 1989) was an NFL offensive tackle in the National Football League who played nine seasons with the Miami Dolphins. He was a member of the Dolphins' undefeated team in 1972. He played both college football and basketball at Lamar University.

Early years
Moore attended Charlton-Pollard High School. He played defensive end for Texas High School Hall of Fame coach Willie Ray Smith Sr. and was a teammate of Smith's son, Bubba Smith. He also was a forward in basketball, helping his team win the Prairie View Interscholastic League state championship in 1964.

He accepted a basketball scholarship to play at Lamar University in his hometown, under coach Jack Martin.  In 1968, he led the team with 302 total rebounds and averaged 12.6 points a game. He finished his college career with 718 rebounds.

In 1993, Moore was posthumously enshrined in the Cardinal Hall of Honor for his achievements on the basketball court.

Professional career

San Francisco 49ers
In 1969, he was signed as an undrafted free agent by the San Francisco 49ers, after 49ers player Johnny Fuller recommended him to scout John Nikchivich. He was tried at tight end and offensive tackle, before being released during preseason and signed to the taxi squad.

1970, he was released before the season started and the 49ers tried to pass him through waivers by using the name Solomon Moore and putting defensive tackle as his position on the waiver list.

Miami Dolphins
In 1970, the Dolphins' new offensive line coach Monte Clark discovered Solomon was Moore's legal first name and claimed the offensive tackle off waivers from his former team, the San Francisco 49ers,

Moore would become an integral part of the Dolphins' success in the 1970s decade, while starting at left tackle. Over his career, he played in three Super Bowls (VI, VII, and VIII) with the Dolphins and was selected to the Pro Bowl in 1973.

Personal life
After his retirement, Moore became a salesman for a construction company. On August 19, 1989, two days after his 44th birthday, he suffered a heart attack at his home in Miami and was pronounced dead at Coral Reef Hospital that afternoon.

References

External links
A fading legend: Moore's stature didn't overshadow his humility

1945 births
1989 deaths
Sportspeople from Beaumont, Texas
Players of American football from Texas
American Conference Pro Bowl players
American football offensive tackles
Lamar Cardinals basketball players
Miami Dolphins players
American men's basketball players